Richard Muspratt (13 August 1822 – 18 August 1885) was a chemical industrialist.

Richard Muspratt was born in Liverpool, England, the second son of James Muspratt and his wife Julia Josephine née Connor.  His father was also a chemical industrialist who had established factories in Liverpool, St Helens and Newton-le-Willows.  Richard was sent by his father to study chemistry under Justus von Liebig at the University of Giessen in Hesse-Darmstadt, Germany.

In 1852 with financial support from his father he set up an alkali manufacturing factory in Flint, North Wales, in partnership with John Kingsby Huntley and set up a permanent home there.

In 1843 he married Jane Moon from Manchester.  They had three sons and a daughter.  Muspratt took an interest in local politics, was a J.P. and in 1857 was elected mayor of Flint.  In all he was mayor 9 times and in 1877 his wife presented a chain of office to the town.

References
Citations

Sources

1822 births
1885 deaths
English chemists
University of Giessen alumni
Businesspeople from Liverpool
Politicians from Liverpool
19th-century English businesspeople